The Intertype Corporation produced the Intertype, a typecasting machine closely resembling the Linotype, and using the same matrices as the Linotype. It was founded in New York in 1911 by Hermann Ridder, of Ridder Publications, as the International Typesetting Machine Company, but purchased by a syndicate for $1,650,000 in 1916 and reorganized as the Intertype Corporation.

Originally, most of their machines were rebuilt Linotypes. By 1917, however, Intertype was producing three models of its own machine. Most of the original patents for the Linotype had expired and so the basic works of the Intertype were essentially the same, though incorporating at least 51 improvement patents. The standard Intertype could cast type up to thirty points and they also offered a "Composing Stick Attachment" that allowed their caster to be used to cast headlines up to 60 points.

Despite initial liquidity problems, Intertype was quite successful in later years, producing mixer machines, high speed machines, and the first photo-type compositor. In 1957, Intertype merged with Harris-Seybold, a manufacturer of presses and paper cutters, to become Harris-Intertype Corporation. After the merger, the Harris-Intertype Fotosetter was introduced. It was the first photo-typesetting machine and was based upon the standard Intertype machine, replacing the brass type matrices with small film negatives and instead of casting, used these to expose photographic paper.

Type Development
Throughout its history, Intertype machines were typically better built and engineered than Mergenthaler's Linotype, with simpler, more effective mechanisms. However, while both Mergenthaler and Lanston Monotype were known for producing new and innovative type designs, virtually all of Intertype's typefaces were derivatives of, or supplied to them, by the Bauer Type Foundry. The only type designer of note associated with Intertype was Edwin W. Shaar, who pioneered in adapting script faces for machine composition.

Intertype Matrices
These typefaces were produced by Intertype:

Intertype Berlin
The Berlin branch of Intertype was actually more active in producing new designs than the parent company. The following matrices were produced there:

References

External links 

 Intertype Book of Instruction is a complete manual on the operation and maintenance of the various models of Intertype machine
 Book of Intertype Faces is a catalogue showing the typefaces and fonts available for Intertype machines

Defunct manufacturing companies based in New York City
Letterpress font foundries
Letterpress font foundries of the United States
Cold type foundries
Manufacturing companies established in 1911
Manufacturing companies disestablished in 1957
1957 disestablishments in New York (state)
1911 establishments in New York (state)